The Acre-class destroyers were a class of six destroyers built during World War II for the Brazilian Navy. None were completed before the end of the war. They are also referred to in some sources as the Amazonas class.

Design 
Built in Brazil to a modified British design along with some U.S. equipment, they were built to replace six H-class destroyers (or Jurua class) ordered from Britain but purchased by Britain for use in the war. Due to design complications, the ships took a long time to complete, having been finished from 1949 to 1951.

The ships received a refit in the early 1960s with new electronics and gun no. 2 being replaced by a 40mm Bofors mounting.  Two ships were decommissioned in 1964 and the remaining four from 1973 to 1974.

Ships 

The six ships were:

See also

List of ship classes of the Second World War

References 

 Gardiner, Robert and Roger Chesneau. Conway's All The World's Fighting Ships 1922–1946. London: Conway Maritime Press, 1980. .
 Whitley M.J. Destroyers of World War Two: An International Encyclopedia. London: Cassell Publishing, 2000. 

 

Destroyer classes